Fedoseikha is a rural locality (a village) in Mstyora Urban Settlement, Vyaznikovsky District, Vladimir Oblast, Russia. The population was 13 as of 2010.

Geography 
Fedoseikha is located 20 km northwest of Vyazniki (the district's administrative centre) by road. Naleskino is the nearest rural locality.

References 

Rural localities in Vyaznikovsky District